Walid Athmani (born February 15, 1992) is an Algerian footballer who currently plays for WA Boufarik in the Algerian Ligue 2. Athmani was part of the Algeria national under-17 football team that finished as runner-ups at the 2009 African U-17 Championship.

References

External links
 

1992 births
Algerian footballers
Algerian Ligue Professionnelle 1 players
Algerian Ligue 2 players
Living people
People from Biskra
MC Oran players
USM El Harrach players
OM Arzew players
Algeria youth international footballers
Association football midfielders
21st-century Algerian people